Maciej Tataj (born 9 January 1980 in Warsaw) is a Polish former footballer and current manager of IV liga team Ząbkovia Ząbki.

Career

Club

Tataj started his career with Okęcie Warszawa.

In July 2011, he was loaned to Dolcan Ząbki on a one-year deal.

References

External links
 

1980 births
Living people
Polish footballers
Polish expatriate footballers
Ząbkovia Ząbki players
Polonia Warsaw players
Motor Lublin players
Korona Kielce players
Vaasan Palloseura players
Ekstraklasa players
Veikkausliiga players
Expatriate footballers in Finland
Footballers from Warsaw
Association football forwards